The 1994 Michigan State Spartans football team competed on behalf of Michigan State University as a member of the Big Ten Conference during the 1994 NCAA Division I-A football season. Led by George Perles was in his 12th and final season as head coach, the Spartans finished the season with an overall record of 5–6 and a mark of 4–4 in conference play, tying for fifth place in the Big Ten. Michigan State played home games at Spartan Stadium in East Lansing, Michigan.

Perles was fired on November 8, although he was allowed to coach the remaining games on the schedule. Although the NCAA found no infractions after two investigations requested by Michigan State president Peter M. McPherson, Spartans forfeited their five wins from the 1994 due to a 'lack of institutional control'. As a result, the Spartans official record for the season dropped 0–11 overall and 0–8 in conference play, placing them last out of 11 teams in Big Ten. With the forfeits, this remains the Spartans worst record in program history.

Schedule

Personnel
 LB No. 22 Reggie Garnett, So.
 OT No. 79 Brian DeMarco, Sr.

1995 NFL Draft
The following players were selected in the 1995 NFL Draft.

References

Michigan State
Michigan State Spartans football seasons
College football winless seasons
Michigan State Spartans football